The Japan Day (German: Japan-Tag) is a German-Japanese festival celebrated every year in May or June at Düsseldorf in Germany. The celebration can be seen as the successor of the Japan Week (German: Japan-Woche), that was first held in 1983 and again in 1993, as well as of the Japan Year (German: Japan-Jahr) 1999/2000. It is the largest festival of its kind in the world. North Rhine-Westphalia is the home of the biggest Japanese community in continental Europe. According to German media in 2014 and 2016 the Japan Day attracted about 750,000 visitors, while the Japanese Consulate in Germany claims for the 2007 event a record figure of more than one million spectators.

Program 

Every Japan Day features the sale of Japanese food and drinks, as well as an extensive stage and sports program. Previous events have had performances by Japanese musicians, including koto players, choirs, J-Pop and J-Rock groups, as well as martial artists.

In addition, there are several stalls showcasing Japanese culture, such as kimono-fitting and a sake-seminar. Another attraction was a samurai army camp.

Late in the evening, a Bon dance marks the final event of the day. Spectators are invited to take part in the dance and Happis and Japanese fans are distributed to those participating.

The celebration closes with Japanese fireworks, consisting of several parts, each dedicated to a different topic.

2020 Cancellation
For the first time since its inception, the 2020 Japan Day event scheduled for 16 May was cancelled with no plans for a postponed event to take place later in the year due to the COVID-19 pandemic. It is expected to resume as normal by the next planned event, taking place on 29 May 2021.

2021 Cancellation 
Due to the COVID-19 pandemic also the edition for 2021, that was originally scheduled for 29 May 2021, will be postponed  to May 2022. As an alternative there will be a series of smaller Japan-events that will be organised later this year.

See also 

 Japanese community in Düsseldorf
 Japanische Internationale Schule in Düsseldorf

Sources

External links 

Official Info about the Japan Day

Japanese culture
Japanese diaspora in Germany
Events in Düsseldorf
Tourist attractions in Düsseldorf